The Wrocław Holy Trinity (in Polish: Trójca Święta ze Świerzawy or Tron Łaski ze Świerzawy) is a Bohemian panel painting dating from the period around 1350.

History of the painting 
The picture was discovered in 1898 in the loft of the Church of SS John the Baptist and Catherine of Alexandria in Świerzawa, Lower Silesia, and given to the diocesan museum in Wrocław. In 1904 it was restored in Berlin. After 1945 it was in the state art collection at the Wawel in Krakow, then in 1964 it was transferred to the then Wrocław Silesian Regional Museum. It is now in the collection of the National Museum in Wrocław.

Description and context 
The picture is painted in tempera on an oak panel covered with stretched canvas. A drawing is etched into the chalk base and its contours outlined in black. The picture is characterised by a symmetrical composition, simplified perspective-based projection and precise drawing.

The panel in all likelihood formed part of a diptych along with the Death of the Virgin Mary of Košátky by the same artist.  It belongs to the circle of the workshop of the Master of the Vyšší Brod Altarpiece. Its Bohemian origin is demonstrated by a number of features in the drawing details that correspond with other works. These include the similarity of the throne, ornaments and cushion with the Madonna of Kłodzko and the similarity of the composition, figural types, modelling and painting technique with the Death of the Virgin Mary of Košátky.

Notes

References 
 Mateusz Kapustka, Jan Klípa, Andrzej Kozieł, Piotr Oszczanowski, Śląsk - perła w Koronie Czeskiej. Trzy okresy świetności w relacjach artystycznych Śląska i Czech Katalog wystawy w Muzeum Miedzi w Legnicy i Národní galerie v Praze 2006-2007. Wrocław-Praha 2006
 Jiří Fajt (ed.), Karel IV. Císař z boží milosti. Kultura a umění za vlády posledních Lucemburků 1347-1437: katalog výstavy, Pražský hrad 16. února - 21. května 2006, Praha 2006, pp. 319–320 
 Alicja Karłowska-Kamzowa, Malarstwo śląskie 1250-1450, Warszawa-Wrocław 1979
 Karel Stejskal, Umění na dvoře Karla IV, Artia Praha 1978
 Jaroslav Pešina, Česká gotická desková malba, Odeon, Praha 1976
 Albert Kutal, České gotické umění, Obelisk  Artia, Praha 1972
 Anna Fedorowicz, Malarstwo XIV i pocz. XV w. : św. Trójca ze Świerzawy, św. Anna Samotrzecia ze Strzegomia, Madonna z Dzieciątkiem z Wrocławia, ołtarzyk z Ruska, Wrocław : Muzeum Śląskie, 1964.
 Antonín Matějček, Jaroslav Pešina, Česká malba gotická, Melantrich, Praha 1950

External links 
 Swierzawa, Historia 700-letnego obrazu ze Świerzawy, 2013

Gothic paintings
Czech gothic paintings
Paintings depicting the Crucifixion of Jesus